Pont is a hamlet in Cornwall, England. Pont is about half a km north of Lanteglos-by-Fowey churchtown and east of Pont Pill.

It is thought that Pont began as a settlement when the parish's first Celtic saint, St Wyllow, came and settled in a cave by the head of Pont around 596.

References

Hamlets in Cornwall